Graeme Cordy (born 23 October 1962) is a former Australian rules footballer who played with Footscray and the Sydney Swans  in the Victorian Football League (VFL).

Like his two older brothers, Brian and Neil, Cordy started his career at Footscray. The Traralgon recruit would however only manage six appearances for the club, before moving to Sydney in 1987, with his brother Neil. A key forward, he played 10 games for Sydney in each of his first two seasons, but struggled with injuries. He joined the Wodonga Football Club after leaving Sydney.

References

1962 births
Australian rules footballers from Victoria (Australia)
Western Bulldogs players
Sydney Swans players
Wodonga Football Club players
Traralgon Football Club players
Living people